Lukhdhirji Engineering College, popularly known as L.E. College or LEC Morbi is located in the Morbi district. The institute is operated by the government of Gujarat and is affiliated with Gujarat Technological University.

History 

In 1951 Maharaja Thakore Shri Sir Lukhdhirji Waghji Sahib Bahadur of Morvi met Professor Sunder Singh Bhatia from the Dayalbagh Educational Institute and asked him to upgrade the Morvi Technical Institute (MTI) to a full-fledged degree engineering college and become its first principal. The Maharaja had four palaces. The Nazarbag palace was donated to become what is now the Engineering College. Another two palaces became student accommodation and the principal's private residence respectively. The fourth palace was retained by the Maharaja as his personal residence.

Campus 
The campus is located on the banks of river Machhu in Morbi, Gujarat. The campus is divided into clusters of buildings. The academic area consists of various departmental buildings, the administration block, the students amenities building, and a badminton court and swimming pool. The academic area is divided into old campus and new campus:

Old Campus:

 Department of Civil Engineering 
 Badminton court 
 Annexe 1
 Annexe 2
 General Department- Old Building
 Applied Mechanics - Old Wing
 Applied Mechanics - New Wing
 Water Resource Lab
 Hydrology Lab
 Drawing Hall 1 & 2
 Mechanical Workshop
 Department of Production Engineering
 Department of Electrical Engineering - Old Building
 Electrical Machine Lab
 Diploma IT & Central Library 
 Student Amenities Building
 Ceramic Technology Department 
 LEC Old Building (Palatial Building)

 
New Campus:

 Department of Power Electronics Engineering 
 Department of IT Engineering 
 Department of Industrial Engineering
 Department of Mechanical Engineering 
 New Building (Administration, Siemens Center of Excellence, and the Electrical and Chemical Departments)

Further college has separate boys and girls hostel which can accommodate around 1200 students. The hostel campus occupies the area of around 25 acres. Hostel  Machhu A, Machhu B, Machhu D, Machhu E, New Hill, NVP and New Hostel are for boys and Hostel Machhu F & Machhu G are for girls. The college has its own cricket ground with pavilion which spans over 6 acres.

Academic departments  
The institute has ten major academic departments:
 Department of Electrical Engineering (Est. 1951, Intake- UG -120, PG-18)
 Department of Civil Engineering (Est. 1951, Intake- UG -120, PG-18)
 Department of Mechanical Engineering (Est. 1951, Intake- UG -60)
 Department of IT Engineering (Est. 1999, Intake- UG -30)
 Department of Production Engineering (Est. 1970, Intake- UG-30)
 Department of Chemical Engineering (Est. 2008, Intake- UG -60)
 Department of Industrial Engineering (Est. 1983, Intake- UG -30)
 Department of Power Electronics Engineering (Est. 1983, Intake- UG -60, PG-18)
 General Department (Humanities, Maths & Physics Department) 
 Applied Mechanics Department

Siemens, in association with Government of Gujarat, has established a Center of Excellence in Industrial Machinery on the campus. It organizes several certification courses like PLC Scada, NX and NX Advance, Induction Motor Training.

Activities 

Apart from conventional departments, L.E. College Morbi has several other important organizations and cells which are run jointly by students, alumni and institute and cater to the purpose as defined in their respective charter. Following is a glimpse of some of the organizations & cells and their activities and aims.

LENCO Alumni Association 
The association organizes reunion every year and along with it they also organize 'Annual Gold Medal Award Function' in which toppers of the most recent graduated batch are awarded a gold medal and a certificate by the alumni association.

NCC 
The institute is a part of Rajkot Battalion of NCC. The cadets from this institute regularly participates in the camps and drills organized by NCC at state and national level and has brought laurels for the institute. Presently it is mentored by Prof. K. K. Dave from Mechanical Engineering Department.

Center of Creativity (COC) 
This department of established in 2012 by then principle Prof. P.C. Vasani in order to promote extra curricular activities in the institute. Since its inception, COC has organized 4 techfests ( VIJAYANT '12, '13, '14 and '15), several cultural activities such as Saptdhara, Matru Bhasa Divas, Annual Open House etc. The department is one of the most dynamic department of the institute which regularly organizes curricular and extra curricular activities and thus provides the platform to the students to showcase their talents and nurture their temperament. The department is chaired by Prof. M.H. Ayalani and has several dynamic and enthusiastic faculties associated with it like Prof. K.K. Dave, Prof. Jagruti Bheda etc.

Electrical Engineering Students Association (EESA) 
Electrical Engineering Students Association is a local student chapter at Electrical Engineering Department established by the enthusiasts of 2016 batch. Apart from technical lectures, seminars, symposiums etc. EESA also organizes various non technical activities at the departmental level such as Welcome & Farewell Functions, College Days, Departmental Day etc.

Training and Placement Cell & Personality Development Cell (TP&PDC) 
Training and placement cell was established in the year 1962.

Gymkhana 
L.E. College Morbi gives equal emphasis on sports and every year Annual Sports Week is organized in the even semester and various tournaments are organized in this week covering wide range of sports such as Volleyball, Cricket, Badminton etc. Students of L.E. College also participate in University Sports Meets and National Sports Meet. College sports teams have bought laurels in various games like Cricket, Kabaddi, Kho-Kho etc. in past.

VIJAYANT - The Annual Tech fest     
Vijayant is the annual techfest of the institute. Its first edition was pioneered by 2012 batch and thus from then onward, the fest is organized every year with great enthusiasm and attracts participation from different institutes across the state. The latest edition of VIJAYANT was organized on 19 and 20 March 2015. It had more than 18 events (technical+non technical) and more than 1600 students participated in it. The theme of the techfest was 'Born to Win'.

Clubs 

 Society welfare Club
 Stock market analysis Club
 IGNITE Club
 Industry interaction Club
 Debating Club
 Entrepreneurship Club
 Design Club
 Robotics Club
 Sports Club
 Adventure Club
 Astronomy Club
 Quizzing Club
 Nature Club
 Readers and Writers Club
 Gaming and Programming CLub
 Sculpture, Drawing and Painting Club
 Dance Club
 Drama Club
 Melodious Music Club
 Photography and Films Club
 Yoga Club

Notable alumni

 Mr Arjun Modhwadia, Ex. Leader of Opposition, Gujarat Assembly

References

External links 
  Lukhdhirji Engineering College
 Lenco Alumni Association

Engineering colleges in Gujarat
Morbi district